Holywood Cricket Club 1881 is a cricket club in Holywood, County Down, Northern Ireland, playing in the Northern Cricket Unions ("NCU") Senior League.

History
The Club was founded in 1881, originally playing at Kinnegar in Holywood but after an 1885 storm blew the pavilion away the club found a new home at Belfast Road, where it stayed until 1996. Holywood experienced difficulties in 1997 as a result of the raising by St Paul’s Gaelic Athletic Club on its adjacent pitch, which was used by the cricket club as its outfield. For the 1997 season the club moved to Sullivan Upper School thanks to the generosity of the school and its then headmaster John Young. This arrangement lasted 8 seasons until the club moved to their current home at the ‘Seapark Oval’ (Seapark Road, Holywood, BT18 0LL). The male teams of the club are known as The Black Knights, the junior / youth teams are known as the Green Dragons, and the women's teams are known as the Aces and Bandits.

Holywood has produced many great players over its history and some of those who have excelled are Bill Pollock, Brian Shannon, Ernie Shannon, Con McCall and  Stewart McCormick.International wicketkeepers that learned the game at Holywood are Paul Moore and Gary Wilson. On the administration side, Holywood has produced NCU presidents such as R.M. Erskine and Dawson Moreland. Cecil Cave was president of what is now Cricket Ireland in 1976.

The Graham Cup, the Premier U15 competition on the NCU, is also linked to Holywood. The cup was donated by Mr. H Graham and his son Harry was a member of the Holywood team that won the trophy in its 1st year. The Final was held at Holywood until 1996.

Junior cricket
In 2018 Holywood created an extensive schools coaching programme that provides an introduction to the game for many primary and secondary schools in North Down and East Belfast.

The Club has a large junior section for both boys and girls (more than 300 children in 2019) aged 3+ and fields 2 U9 teams (incrediball), 4 Under11 hardball teams (including 1 all-girls team. The only club in Northern Ireland to do so), 3 Under13 teams (including 1 all-girls team) and an Under15 team. In June the club hosts "The Mini World Cup" of KWIK Cricket for ~ 200 primary school age boys and girls from 10+ different schools and also hosts 2 all-girls KWIK Cricket Tournaments for ~ 280 players at Under13 and Under15 levels.

In 2019 Holywood introduced "Mini Bouncers" for kids aged 3 to 7 to provide their 1st contact with the sport of cricket and the fundamentals of movement.

There is also a summer scheme run in July and August and a summer cricket camp held also during the school holidays.

Girls and women's cricket
In 2018 the club began a long term strategic plan to become a centre for female cricket, working closely with Sullivan Upper School, Rockport School and Strathearn School. Holywood hosts numerous female cricket tournaments, both inter-school and inter-club. The latter featuring its own club female teams the Holywood Aces and Holywood Bandits.

Social media
Instagram
Facebook
Twitter
Governing Body
Youtube
LinkedIn
 Website for Bookings. Academy

Honours
NCU Senior League: 6 (1 shared)
1901, 1909, 1912, 1914, 1956, 1958 (shared)
NCU Challenge Cup: 2
1899, 1905

Cricket clubs in County Down
NCU Senior League members
1881 establishments in Ireland
Cricket clubs in Northern Ireland